Albinețul Vechi is a commune in Fălești District, Moldova. It is composed of four villages: Albinețul Nou, Albinețul Vechi, Rediul de Jos and Rediul de Sus.

References

Communes of Fălești District